Edward Frank "Teddy" Schwarzman (born May 29, 1979) is an American film producer and former corporate lawyer. He is the founder, president and chief executive of Black Bear Pictures, whose productions include the 2014 film The Imitation Game.

Early life and education
Teddy Schwarzman was born in 1979 in New York City, to Stephen A. Schwarzman, a co-founder, chairman and CEO of The Blackstone Group, and Ellen Katz (née Philips), a trustee of Northwestern University and the Mount Sinai Medical Center and his sister is writer and podcaster Zibby Owens. His family is Jewish. He graduated from the University of Pennsylvania with a degree in English before completing a J.D. degree from the Duke University School of Law.

Career 
Schwarzman was a corporate lawyer at Skadden, a New York-based firm, where he specialized in real estate and corporate restructuring. He left Skadden to work in the film industry; his first job was as a personal assistant on The Other Woman, which was produced in 2009 and released in 2010. He later said of the experience: "It was one of those situations that you had to prove that you actually want to be in this business." He went on to work for John Sloss's film advisory company, Cinetic Media, where he was involved in raising funds to produce the 2011 films Bernie and The Loneliest Planet.

Schwarzman left Cinetic in 2011 to found his own production company, Black Bear Pictures, of which he is the president and CEO. There, the first film he produced was At Any Price (2012), followed by the 2013 films Broken City, A.C.O.D. and All Is Lost. His fifth and most successful film was The Imitation Game, a 2014 biopic about Alan Turing, which he produced alongside Nora Grossman and Ido Ostrowsky. Schwarzman bought Graham Moore's screenplay when Warner Bros. sold it in 2012, competing with 30 other producers who wanted to acquire the script. The Imitation Game received many accolades, including Academy Award and BAFTA Award nominations for Best Picture and Best British Film, respectively. Schwarzman, Grossman and Ostrowsky were also nominated for a Producers Guild of America Award.

Personal life
Schwarzman married Ellen Marie Zajac, a New York City lawyer whom he met at Duke, in November 2007 in Montego Bay, Jamaica. They have three children and live in Los Angeles, California.

Filmography as producer
He was producer for all films unless otherwise noted.

Film

Thanks

Television

References

External links

1979 births
Living people
Corporate lawyers
Duke University School of Law alumni
Film producers from New York (state)
Jewish American attorneys
Lawyers from New York City
Skadden, Arps, Slate, Meagher & Flom people
University of Pennsylvania alumni
21st-century American Jews